First Round Capital is a US-based venture capital firm that specializes in providing seed-stage funding to technology companies.

Founded by Josh Kopelman and Howard Morgan First Round typically provides seed-stage funding and focuses on portfolio companies' growth during their first 18 months. It has offices in San Francisco, Philadelphia and New York.

In 2012, the firm launched Dorm Room Fund for college students to fund startups founded by their peers. In 2019, the firm launched the Graduate Fund, a pre-seed fund for recent graduates of undergraduate or master's programs.

References

Venture capital firms of the United States
Financial services companies established in 2004
Companies based in Philadelphia